Scalzi may refer to:

Building
Scalzi (Verona) religious building in Verona, Italy
Scalzi (Venice), Roman Catholic Carmelite church in Venice, Italy

People
Carlo Scalzi (c. 1700–after 1738), Italian castrato
Joe Scalzi (1951), Australian politician
John Scalzi (born 1969), American science fiction author 
Johnny Scalzi (1907–1962), American baseball player 
Mike Scalzi (born 1969), American musician and philosophy professor
Sandra Scalzi (born 1986), Australian association footballer
Skeeter Scalzi (1913–1984), American baseball player
Vittorio De Scalzi (born 1949), Italian singer